Stenoptilia platanodes is a moth of the family Pterophoridae. It is found in Taiwan.

References

Moths described in 1914
platanodes
Moths of Taiwan